, there were 8,790 battery electric vehicles registered in Greece. , 11.8% of new cars registered in Greece were electric.

Government policy
, the Greek government offers subsidies of up to €6,000 for electric vehicle purchases, and €500 for charging station installations.

Charging stations
, there were around 1,700 public charging stations in Greece. , there was one public charging station for every  of road in the country.

By region

Attica
, there were 62 public charging stations in Athens.

North Aegean
In October 2022, West Lesbos added an electric car to its municipal fleet, becoming the first municipality in Greece to do so.

References

Greece
Road transport in Greece